The scaly-throated honeyguide (Indicator variegatus) is a species of bird in the family Indicatoridae.

Range

It is found in Angola, Burundi, DRC, Eswatini, Ethiopia, Kenya, Malawi, Mozambique, Rwanda, Somalia, South Africa, South Sudan, Tanzania, Uganda, Zambia, and Zimbabwe.

Habitat 
Scaly-throated honeyguides are found in dense woodland, thickets, and forest, usually only identifiable by their high-pitched, trill-like ascending call. Regarding size, they are 18–19 cm in length, weighing 34–55 g and rarely up to 61 g.

References

External links 

 Scaly-throated honeyguide, species text in The Atlas of Southern African Birds
 Image, ADW
 Mystery bird: Scaly-throated honeyguide, Indicator variegatus, Guardian Online

scaly-throated honeyguide
Birds of East Africa
Birds of Southern Africa
scaly-throated honeyguide
Taxa named by René Lesson
Taxonomy articles created by Polbot